Six Songs of Hellcity Trendkill is an EP by the Finnish rock band Private Line. It was released in Finland in December 2002.

Track listing

 Makin' a Mess Since '77
 Downstairs Upstairs
 Superstar IQ
 Grown Like Others
 Virgin Suicide
 Crack in Reality

Private Line albums
2002 EPs